Giambattista Avellino (born 18 November 1957) is an Italian director and screenwriter.

Life and career 
Born in Livorno, Avellino started his career  as a comic book writer, collaborating with the magazines Skorpio and Lanciostory. He debuted as a screenwriter in 1991, for the Aldo Lado's TV-miniseries La stella del parco.

After an intense career on television, Avellino signed his first screenplay for a theatrically released film in 2002, for the Ficarra e Picone's vehicle Nati stanchi. His collaboration with the Sicilian comedy duo continued with  Il 7 e l'8 and La matassa, both which they co-directed. For Il 7 e l'8 Avellino and Ficarra e Picone  were nominated to David di Donatello for Best New Director and to Silver Ribbon in the same category.

Selected filmography 
Screenwriter
  Nati stanchi (2002)
 Easy! (2011)

Director and screenwriter
 Il 7 e l'8 (2007)
  La matassa (2009)
  Some Say No (2011)

References

External links 
 

1957 births
Living people
Italian film directors
Italian television directors
People from Livorno
20th-century Italian screenwriters
21st-century Italian screenwriters
Italian male screenwriters